The ashy-headed laughingthrush (Argya cinereifrons) is a member of the family Leiothrichidae. The laughingthrushes are a large family of Old World passerine birds characterised by soft fluffy plumage. These are birds of tropical areas, with the greatest variety in southeast Asia.

Taxonomy
The ashy-headed laughingthrush was formerly placed in the genus Garrulax but following the publication of a comprehensive molecular phylogenetic study in 2018, it was moved to the resurrected genus Argya.

Description
The ashy-headed laughingthrush is a rangy bird, 23 centimetre (9 in) in length with a long floppy tail. It is rufous brown above and deep buff below, with a grey head and white throat. Like other babblers, these are noisy birds, and the characteristic laughing calls are often the best indication that they are present, since they are often difficult to see in their preferred habitat.

Distribution and habitat
The ashy-headed laughingthrush is a resident breeding bird endemic to Sri Lanka. Its habitat is rainforest, and it is seldom seen away from deep jungle or dense bamboo thickets in the wet zone. This species, like most babblers, is not migratory, and has short rounded wings and a weak flight.

Although its habitat is under threat, this laughingthrush occurs in all the forests of the wet zone, and is quite common at prime sites like Kitulgala and Sinharaja. It builds its nest in a bush, concealed in dense masses of foliage. The normal clutch is three or four eggs.

Behaviour
As with other babbler species, ashy-headed laughingthrushes frequently occur in groups of up to a dozen, and are also often found in the mixed feeding flocks typical of tropical Asian jungle. They feed mainly on insects, but also eat jungle berries.

In culture

In Sri Lanka, this bird is known as alu demalichcha ("ash-babbler") in Sinhala language. The ashy-headed laughingthrush appears in a 3 rupee Sri Lankan postal stamp,.

References

 Birds of India by Grimmett, Inskipp and Inskipp, 
 A Field Guide to the Birds of the Indian Subcontinent by Kazmierczak (au) and van Perlo (il), 

ashy-headed laughingthrush
Endemic birds of Sri Lanka
ashy-headed laughingthrush
ashy-headed laughingthrush
Taxobox binomials not recognized by IUCN